Ptilotrigona is a genus of bees belonging to the family Apidae.

The species of this genus are found in Southern America.

Species:

Ptilotrigona lurida 
Ptilotrigona occidentalis 
Ptilotrigona pereneae

References

Meliponini